Tyler Shough (born September 28, 1999) is an American football quarterback for the Texas Tech Red Raiders. Shough began his college career with the Oregon Ducks from 2018 to 2020 before transferring to Texas Tech in 2021.

Early life and high school career
Shough is a native of Chandler, Arizona and Glenn and Dana Shough's fourth of five children. Shough's parents met as students at Arizona State University. His father Glenn is a retired police officer, currently teaching criminal justice with driver’s education, and his mother Dana is a retired educator. In 2009, Dana was diagnosed with stage 4 metastatic breast cancer.

His elder sisters attended Hamilton High School in Chandler, Arizona, where Shough and his younger brother Brady played in the football program. According to the family, he was friends with future Major League Baseball player Cody Bellinger while they were students at Hamilton.

Shough became the starting varsity quarterback as a junior at the high-profile Hamilton High School football program in the 2016 season. His performance garnered an honorable mention in Arizona's 6A Premier League, listed in the 6th toughest football regions in the nation. The team ended their season in the 6A quarterfinals with a 7–5 record, the worst in the school's history until they scored 3–7 in 2018.

As a senior, Shough played for Hamilton in its 2017 season when allegations of hazing were publicized, which resulted in the conviction of three players and the permanent reassignment of three administrators, including head coach Steve Belles, to Chandler Unified School District (CUSD) offices. Shough was not implicated in the hazing scandal. His team made it to the 6A state quarterfinals, and he earned a first-team 6A Premier League and all-CUSD awards. He was also selected as a Semper Fidelis All-American, from the US Marine Corps. Hamilton had an overall 15–9 record with Shough as a starter setting school records with the most losses, completions, attempts, yards, and touchdowns in the school's 20-year history.

Shough was a highly sought after player being a consensus 4-star pro-style quarterback by both Scout and 247Sports. Scout ranked him 16th best at quarterback and 183rd best player overall nationwide. Multiple athletic scholarships were offered from Alabama, California, Georgia, Florida State, Michigan, South Carolina, and Indiana. After an initial verbal commitment to North Carolina in June 2017, Shough signed an early letter of intent to Oregon in December 2018.

College career

Oregon
Shough appeared in three games, and played eighteen snaps before redshirting the rest of the season.

As a redshirt freshman, Shough served as the Ducks backup quarterback during the 2019 season behind Justin Herbert, finishing the season with 144 yards and three touchdowns in eight games played off the bench.

Going into 2020, Oregon head coach Mario Cristobal indicated early that Shough would be the starting quarterback (vacated by Justin Herbert being moved to the National Football League (NFL)).

Oregon and the other Pac-12 conference member schools began play in November with strict policies regarding testing, positivity rate, and contact tracing for the COVID-19 pandemic. Shough became the starter, winning the season opener against Stanford 35-14. Shough started every game including the Pac-12 Championship Game, a 31–24 win against USC.

Shough's performance was questioned when the heavily-favored Oregon team lost back-to-back games against Oregon State and California. Due to the losses, Oregon would not have made it to the Pac-12 championship if Washington had not cancelled a regular season game against Oregon due to COVID-19 restrictions, a game that would have decided the Pac-12 North race between Oregon and Washington. Despite Shough starting the Pac-12 Championship Game against USC, Boston College transfer Anthony Brown began to take offensive series.

Oregon was selected to the Fiesta Bowl held in Glendale, Arizona, which is inside the Phoenix Metropolitan Area where Shough grew up. The opponent was Iowa State led by quarterback Brock Purdy of Gilbert, Arizona. Oregon lost the game but the 98-yard touchdown drive orchestrated by Brown made the quarterback position uncertain.

On February 12, 2021, Shough had entered the NCAA Transfer Portal with three years left for eligibility.

Texas Tech
On February 22, 2021, Shough announced that he was transferring to Texas Tech University. Arriving at Texas Tech, Shough battled for the starting quarterback position against senior Henry Colombi and freshmen Maverick McIvor, Donovan Smith, and Behren Morton. In the team's spring game, Shough led the team in passing, finishing 8-of-15 for 106 yards. On August 24, head coach Matt Wells announced that Shough would be the starter for the team's week one game against Houston. In his first start for Texas Tech, Shough finished 17-of-24 for 231 yards with one touchdown along with a rushing touchdown as the Red Raiders won 38–21. During the team's week 4 game against Texas, Shough broke his collarbone.

Prior to the 2022 season, Shough was in a competition for the starting quarterback position against sophomore Donovan Smith. On August 21, Shough was named the team's week one starter against Murray State. Against Murray State, Shough exited the game after the first quarter due to a possible injury and did not return to the game. It was later announced that Shough had injured his left shoulder and would be out for at least two weeks. In the regular season finale against Oklahoma, Shough finished with a career-high 436 passing yards in the 51–48 overtime victory. In the Texas Bowl against Ole Miss, Shough finished the game with 242 passing yards and a touchdown along with a career-high 111 rushing yards and two rushing touchdowns in the 42–25 victory, being named the game's MVP.

Statistics

Personal life
Shough is a Christian. In 2019, Shough was baptized with Justin Herbert and Mycah Pittman.

References

External links
Oregon Ducks bio

Living people
1999 births
Players of American football from Arizona
American football quarterbacks
Oregon Ducks football players
Sportspeople from Chandler, Arizona
Texas Tech Red Raiders football players